Steven R. Timmermans (born 26 September 1957 in Grand Rapids, Michigan) was the executive director of the Christian Reformed Church in North America from 2014–2020.

He received a B.S. from Calvin College in 1979 and postgraduate degrees from the University of Michigan (M.S. in Psychology; Ph.D. in Education and Psychology) and is a licensed psychologist in Michigan.

Timmermans has written chapters in several books, including University-Community Partnerships (Eds: T. Soska & A. Johnson Butterfield) and The One in the Many (Ed: Thomas Thompson), and articles for journals and other publications. He writes a monthly column in The Banner.
He was a pediatric psychologist at Mary Free Bed Hospital from 1985–1989 and a professor and administrator at Calvin College from 1989–2003. He became president of Trinity Christian College in Palos Heights, IL in 2003, where he remained until beginning his service as executive director of the CRCNA in 2013.  His community service in the Chicago and Grand Rapids areas led to his engagement in numerous projects, including interfaith efforts, and leadership on various boards. He has also led grant projects from the Ford Foundation, the U.S. Department of Housing and Urban Development, and the W.K. Kellogg Foundation. He is a member of the Fulbright Specialist program.

His wife, Barbara Bosscher Timmermans, is a nursing professor at Calvin College previously at Trinity Christian College. They have seven children, some of whom are adopted from Ethiopia.

References 

1957 births
People from Grand Rapids, Michigan
Calvin University alumni
University of Michigan alumni
Calvin University faculty
Trinity Christian College
Living people